West Bloomfield High School is a public high school in West Bloomfield, Michigan. The school is the only public high school in the West Bloomfield School District. The School Enrollment for the 2010-2011 school year is about 1900. West Bloomfield High School was previously located in the Abbott Middle School building, which opened on January 31, 1955 with an enrollment of 406. From fall 1968 through spring 1971, the school was temporarily located at the site of the current Orchard Lake Middle School.  The current building was built in 1971.  West Bloomfield High School has begun to offer the Advanced Placement International Diploma to the classes of 2011 and beyond.  In addition, it established additional Advanced Placement courses starting the 2010-2011 school year.

The school has been recognized by Newsweek magazine as being in the top 6% of U.S. public high schools.

Building
In 1986, the district responded to growing enrollment by building a new high school. The large, single-story building was designed in a U-shape around a courtyard that faced Orchard Lake Road. In the late 1990s, the courtyard was enclosed by a 2-story addition that gave the school its curved front facade. In 2000, the media center was completely rebuilt with an emphasis on technology. Small additions have been built throughout the 2000s.

Between 1955 and 1966, WBHS was housed in the building that is now Abbott Middle School.
Between fall 1967 and spring 1971, WBHS occupied the building that previously housed Orchard Lake Middle School.

Instructional Project Design program
The school is known for its Instructional Project Design course, based on the philosophy that students must be allowed a say in designing tools that they will use. The tools in question are internet forums and services created for a variety of educational and civic clients. The program is run by the University of Michigan's Flint, MI campus.

The program was responsible for the creation of "Warren Easton in Exile," a noted website designed to virtually "rebuild" a high school in New Orleans that was shut down after being damaged by Hurricane Katrina in 2005. Former projects also include the Michigan Student Caucus (formerly the Michigan Youth Caucus), a partnership with the Michigan State House Special Commission on Civic Engagement.

The 2006-2007 project for IPD is a project with the Trauma Burn Center at the University of Michigan Hospital in Ann Arbor. It focuses on five main areas: Entertainment, School Re-Entry, Communication, Hospital Resource Center and Education/Prevention. There are also plans to integrate the website with the Ann Arbor Hands-On Museum.

Music department 
The West Bloomfield High School Marching Band placed 4th at the MCBA state championship in Flight I in 2011. The WB Marching Band also placed 4th in Flight I in 2010, 3rd in Flight I in 2007, 2nd in Flight I in 2009, and 1st place in Flight I in 2008, the first time the band has received the state championship in the school's history. Nationally, the band was a Bands of America Grand National Semifinalist from 2008-2010 at the Bands of America Grand National Championships. The band was also a Regional finalist at the BOA Ypsilanti Regional in 2007. In 2009 and 2010, the band was named Class AAA Champion in BOA Pontiac Regionals. The band shares staff members with many drum corps including Carolina Crown and Phantom Regiment, as well as top WGI percussion groups such as Rhythm X, Eastside Fury and Motor City Percussion. The West Bloomfield Bands also include the Symphonic Winds, Symphony Band, and Concert Band as well as a Jazz Band.

The WBHS Winter Drumline were the 2014 MCGC Scholastic A State Champions. The group also placed 2nd in Scholastic A at the MCGC state championship in 2007 and 2008, 3rd in Scholastic A in 2009, and 1st in Scholastic Open in 2010, which marked the unit's first state title. The Winter Drumline was also a Scholastic World Class Finalist at WGI World Championships in 2012. They were the 2008 WGI Scholastic A Troy Regional Champions and the 2010 WGI Scholastic Open Troy Regional Champions.

The WBHS Winter Guard were the 2014 MCGC Scholastic AA State Champions. The group also placed 2nd in AA at the 2008 MCGC state championship, and 2nd in Michigan A at the 2006 MCGC State Championship. The Winter Guard placed 6th in Scholastic A in 2009 and was a WGI Ferndale Regional Finalist.

The West Bloomfield High School Orchestra program has 2 orchestras, the concert orchestra (members of this ensemble are primarily freshman and sophomore students) and the symphony orchestra (members of this ensemble are primarily junior and senior students). The orchestral program has won numerous awards at the Michigan Band and Orchestra Music Festivals. These orchestras have received first and second division ratings at both the district and state festivals. The Orchestra department has competed in music festivals outside the state where they received first place and best overall orchestra.

Ford Partnership for Advanced Studies (PAS)
The Ford PAS program is a highly valued program for the school district, with meaningful activities for the students that provide a sense of accomplishment. This program clearly prepares students for Career Focused Education in Math, Science, Technology, and Engineering. The foundation for success with Ford PAS has been established. The district will continue to pursue recruitment of additional students and teachers enrolling in the Ford PAS curriculum.

Advanced Placement courses offered
West Bloomfield High School is known for its wide variety of classes. The following are offered at the school:

A.P. Biology
A.P. Calculus AB
A.P. Calculus BC
A.P. Chemistry
A.P. English Language and Composition
A.P. Environmental Science
A.P. European History
A.P. Literature and Composition
A.P. French Language
A.P. American Government and Politics
A.P. Chinese Language and Culture
A.P. Macroeconomics
A.P. Microeconomics
A.P. Music Theory
A.P. Physics 1
A.P. Physics C
A.P. Psychology
A.P. Spanish Language
A.P. Spanish Literature
A.P. Statistics
A.P. United States History
A.P. World History

Advanced Placement International Diploma
In June 2009, West Bloomfield High School announced the availability of the Advanced Placement International Diploma to the classes of 2011 and beyond.  Utilized by universities around the world in admissions, this diploma requires students to score a 3, 4, or a 5 on exams in the following areas:

AP English
AP Language
AP Math or Science Course
AP World History, AP Human Geography, or AP Government and Politics
One to two AP courses in other areas.

Activities/clubs
West Bloomfield High Schools offers numerous clubs and activities that students can get involved with. Some of these clubs include International Club, Math Club, Earth Club, Law Club, and  ACT Club. The West Bloomfield High School quiz bowl team has also received many accolades. There is after school tutoring available every day and a teacher is always available to assist.

Females in Engineering Academy 
The goal of the program was to get more females involved in the engineering curriculum. The enrollment in engineering classes has greatly increased and there is already a wait list. This grant is responsible for allowing the school to provide enrichment opportunities for these students that would not otherwise have been possible to achieve.

Notable alumni
Melrose Bickerstaff (2001), model and runner up on America's Next Top Model
Justin Bartha (1996), actor
Victoria Chang, poet
Sherilyn Fenn, actress
Mike Hartman, NHL Forward, Buffalo Sabres
Brandon T. Jackson, actor from Roll Bounce (2005), The Brandon T. Jackson Show (TV- 2006), and the blockbuster Tropic Thunder (2008).
Christopher Johns, movie producer, actor and philanthropist.
Todd Krumm, NFL Safety, Chicago Bears
Lisa Brown-Miller, Olympic Women's hockey player
Ryan Destiny, actress, singer
Dana Nessel (1987), 54th Attorney General of Michigan
Matthew Judon (2010), NFL Linebacker, New England Patriots
Trishton Jackson (2016), NFL Wide Receiver, Minnesota Vikings
Donovan Edwards (2021), University of Michigan running back
Adam Grant, Professor of organizational psychology at the Wharton School of the University of Pennsylvania

References

External links
WBHS official website
School district website

Schools in West Bloomfield Township, Michigan
Public high schools in Michigan
Educational institutions established in 1955
High schools in Oakland County, Michigan
School buildings completed in 1971
1955 establishments in Michigan